The American Fork Cemetery Rock Wall on North 100 East in American Fork, Utah, United States, was built in 1937 and 1938. It was a work of the Works Progress Administration. It was listed on the National Register of Historic Places in 1994.

The south wall is 923 feet long and the east wall is 817 feet long, ignoring breaks for entrances.

See also

 National Register of Historic Places listings in Utah County, Utah

References

External links

 
 

Buildings and structures completed in 1937
Buildings and structures in American Fork, Utah
Buildings and structures on the National Register of Historic Places in Utah
Cemeteries in Utah
1937 establishments in Utah
National Register of Historic Places in Utah County, Utah
Works Progress Administration in Utah